Internet research ethics involves the research ethics of social science, humanities, and scientific research carried out via the Internet.

Of particular interest is the example of English Wikipedia and research ethics. The usual view is that private and public spaces become blurred on the Internet. There are a number of objections to this stance, which are all relevant to English Wikipedia research. In particular, it can be difficult for researchers to ensure participant anonymity. One study of 112 published educational technology research papers was able to identify participant identities in 10 of those papers; the majority of these studies had gathered this data under conditions of anonymity.

An assessment of ethics in Internet-based research, together with some recommendations, has been prepared by a Working Committee of the Interagency Advisory Panel on Research Ethics (PRE)in Canada. PRE is a body of external experts established in November 2001 by three Canadian Research Agencies—the Canadian Institutes of Health Research (CIHR), the Natural Sciences and Engineering Research Council (NSERC) and the Social Sciences and Humanities Research Council (SSHRC) -- to support the development and evolution of their joint research ethics policy the Tri-Council Policy Statement: Ethical Conduct for Research Involving Humans (TCPS).

References

Further reading
Markham, A. & Buchanan, E. (2012). Ethical decision-making and Internet research: Recommendations from the AOIR ethics working committee (version 2.0). 
Kitchin, Heather A. (2007) Research Ethics and the Internet: Negotiating Canada's Tri-Council Policy Statement. Fernwood Publishing
Zimmer, Michael (2010). Rethinking the Human Subjects Process. Michael Zimmer.org [blog], 14 June 2010.
Thelwall, Michael (2010). Researching the public web. e-Research Ethics, 12 July 2010. Excerpt: "A simple but strong argument for researching published information on the public web without consent is that the object investigated is the publication and not the person."
Battles, Heather T. (2010). Exploring Ethical and Methodological Issues in Internet-Based Research with Adolescents. International Journal of Qualitative Methods 2010; 9(1): 27-39 PDF, 120 KB. Excerpt from the abstract: "... the author discusses the methodological and ethical concerns surrounding Internet-based qualitative research with youth."
Ferguson, Rebecca (2010). Internet research ethics. Slideshare presentation (12 slides). "Which ethics apply to Internet research? If the Internet is conceptualised as space, then social science research ethics apply. However, if it is conceptualised as text/art, then the ethics of the humanities are more relevant."
Berry, David M. (2004). Internet Research: Privacy, Ethics and Alienation - An Open Source Approach. The Journal of Internet Research, 14(4) PDF, 105 KB. Emphasis on Internet research ethics within the larger context of "open-source ethics".
Gunther Eysenbach and James Till. Ethical issues in qualitative research on Internet communities. BMJ 2001(10 November); 323(7321): 1103-1105. Emphasis on a perspective from the biomedical and health sciences.
Markham, A. (2006). Method as ethic, ethic as method. Journal of Information Ethics, 15(2), 37-55. 
 Charles Ess and the ethics working committee of the Association of Internet Researchers. Provides access to the Ethics Working Committee document on Internet research ethics that was approved by voting members of the AoIR on November 27, 2002 Recommendations from the aoir ethics working committee1, 330 KB.
Internet Research Ethics: Introduction. An introduction, by Charles Ess, to papers that emerged from a panel presentation organized for a conference held at Lancaster University on December 14- December 16, 2001, building on the efforts of the Ethics Working Committee of the Association of Internet Researchers (AoIR). Emphasis on perspectives of researchers and scholars in the social sciences and humanities.
Ethical and Legal Aspects of Human Subjects Research in Cyberspace . Provides access to a report of a workshop held in Washington DC on June 10- June 11, 1999 PDF, 65 KB. Includes useful references to the earlier literature.
 Johns, M. D., Chen, S., & Hall, G. J. (Eds.). (2004). Online Social Research: Methods, Issues & Ethics. Digital formations (p. 273). New York: P. Lang.
 Elizabeth Buchanan (ed.) (2004). Readings in Virtual Research Ethics: Issues and Controversies. Hershey: Idea Group.
 Charles Ess, (2009) Digital Media Ethics. London: Polity.
 Elizabeth Buchanan (2010) "Internet Research Ethics: Past, Present, and Future" in Robert Burnett, Mia Consalvo, and Charles Ess (eds.), The Handbook of Internet Studies. Wiley-Blackwell.
 Boehlefeld, S. (1996). Doing the Right Thing: Ethical Cyber Research. The Information Society, 12(2)(2).

See also
List mining

Professional ethics
Research ethics
Research ethics